A Man and His Dog (Un Homme et Son Chien) is a 2008 French film directed by French director Francis Huster, starring Jean-Paul Belmondo, based on the 1952 film Umberto D. directed by Vittorio De Sica, and written by Cesare Zavattini.

This was the first film in seven years featuring Jean-Paul Belmondo following his recovery from a stroke, and final movie role before his death in 2021.

Plot 
Charles is a retiree who lives in a maid's room in the house of his lover, a rich widow. He is forced out onto the street with his dog after the widow breaks off the relationship, as she decides to marry again. With no home nor way to make money, they wander the streets of Paris.

Cast 

 Jean-Paul Belmondo as Charles
 Hafsia Herzi as Leila
 Julika Jenkins as Jeanne
 Francis Huster as Robert
 Max von Sydow as The Commander
 Jean Dujardin 
 José Garcia 
 Michèle Bernier 
 Daniel Prévost
 Françoise Fabian 
 Pierre Cassignard
 Cristiana Reali
 Tchéky Karyo 
 Pierre Mondy 
 Antoine Duléry
 Charles Gérard
 Patrick Bosso
 Jean-Luc Lemoine 
 Barbara Schulz 
 Sarah Biasini
 Bruno Lochet 
 Rachida Brakni 
 Daniel Olbrychski 
 Aurélien Wiik
 François Perrot
 Nicole Calfan
 Steve Suissa 
 Robert Hossein 
 Jean-Pierre Bernard 
 Micheline Presle
 Emmanuelle Riva
 Jacques Spiesser
 Linda Hardy

References

External links 
 A Man and His Dog Official site (Ocean Films)
 
A Man and His Dog at Le Film Guide

2008 films
Remakes of Italian films
Films set in Paris
French drama films
2000s French-language films
Films about dogs
2000s French films
Films based on works by Cesare Zavattini